The chevron-spotted brown frog (Rana chevronta) is a species of frog in the family Ranidae, endemic to Mount Emei, Sichuan, China. Its natural habitats are temperate forests, freshwater marshes, and intermittent freshwater marshes. It is threatened by habitat loss.

References

Amphibians of China
Rana (genus)
Taxonomy articles created by Polbot
Amphibians described in 1978
Critically endangered fauna of China